Thurston County is the name of two counties in the United States:

 Thurston County, Nebraska
 Thurston County, Washington